Artem Chorniy (born 23 October 1989), is a professional Ukrainian football midfielder.

Career
He is a product of different Mykolaiv City sportive schools.

In January 2014 Chorniy signed a contract with PFC Oleksandria in the Ukrainian First League.

References

External links

1989 births
Living people
Sportspeople from Mykolaiv
Ukrainian footballers
MFC Mykolaiv players
FC Mariupol players
FC Oleksandriya players
Association football midfielders
Ukrainian Premier League players
FC Chornomorets Odesa players
FC Inhulets Petrove players
Ukrainian football managers
FC Vast Mykolaiv managers